High Cross is a village in the East Hampshire district of Hampshire, England. It is 2.9 miles (4.6 km) northwest of Petersfield, north of the A272 road.

The nearest railway station is 2.7 miles (4.3 km) south of the village, at Petersfield.

External links

Villages in Hampshire